Mehmani (also Romanized as Mehmānī; also known as Maihmāni and Mīehmanī) is a village in Byaban Rural District, Byaban District, Minab County, Hormozgan Province, Iran. At the 2006 census, its population was 721, in 139 families.

References 

Populated places in Minab County